Tlepolemus pilosus is a species of beetle in the family Cerambycidae. It was described by Thunberg in 1787. It is known from South Africa.

References

Crossotini
Beetles described in 1787